The Olympus Zuiko Digital ED 70-300mm 1:4.0-5.6 is an interchangeable telezoom lens for Four Thirds. It was announced by Olympus Corporation on June 26, 2007.

References
http://www.dpreview.com/products/olympus/lenses/oly_70-300_4-5p6/specifications

External links
 

070-300mm f 4.0-5.6 ED
Camera lenses introduced in 2007